Udhayan ( Sun) is a 2011 Tamil action film directed by Chaplin and produced by Prabhakaran. The film stars Arulnithi and Pranitha in her Tamil debut, with Santhanam in a supporting role. The film was released on 29 June 2011.

Cast

Arulnithi as Vasanth and Udhayan
Pranitha as Priya
Bhanu Sri Mehra as Manimegalai
Santhanam as Mukundan
Ashish Vidyarthi as Vasanth and Udhayan's father
Ravi Shankar as Appu
Manobala
Pandu
Swaminathan
Singamuthu
Krishnamoorthy
 Bava Lakshmanan
Sriranjini as Priya's mother
Vatsala Rajagopal as Vasanth and Udhayan's grandmother
Debi Dutta as an item number

Soundtrack
The songs were composed by Manikanth Kadri. The lyrics were written by Vaali, Yugabharathi, Annamalai, Surya and Muthamil.

Critical reception
The film opened to negative reviews from critics after its theatrical release on 29 June 2011. A reviewer from Behindwoods.com noted "Udhayan is predictable and has nothing extraordinary to offer." A critic from The New Indian Express noted "with a story-line that is oft-repeated and predictable, it's a passable entertainer". The film did not perform well at the box office.

References

2011 films
Indian action films
2011 masala films
2010s Tamil-language films
2011 directorial debut films
2011 action films